Niblack is a surname. Notable people with the surname include:

Albert Parker Niblack (1859–1929), American admiral 
Silas L. Niblack (1825–1883), American politician, cousin of William
William E. Niblack (1822–1893), American politician

See also
Niblock